Victor Appleton was a house pseudonym used by the Stratemeyer Syndicate and its successors, most famous for being associated with the Tom Swift series of books.

The following series have been published under the Victor Appleton and Victor Appleton II names:

 Tom Swift, 1910–1941
 Motion Picture Chums, 1913–1916
 Moving Picture Boys, 1913–1922
 Movie Boys, 1926–1927
 Don Sturdy, 1925–1935
 Tom Swift, Jr., 1954–1971 (technically, "Victor Appleton II")
 Tom Swift (Third Series), 1981–1984
 Tom Swift (Fourth Series)'', 1991–1993

Howard R. Garis contributed to the original Tom Swift series. James Duncan Lawrence wrote 23 of the Tom Swift, Jr. novels.

See also
Roy Rockwood

References

External links

 
 
 
 
 
 Victor Appleton II at LC Authorities (35 records),  at WorldCat, and at ISFDB

Stratemeyer Syndicate pseudonyms
Tom Swift